Maria Deraismes (17 August 1828 – 6 February 1894) was a French author, Freemason, and major pioneering force for women's rights.

Biography 

Born in Paris, Maria Deraismes grew up in Pontoise in the city's northwest outskirts. From a prosperous middle-class family, she was well educated and raised in a literary environment. She wrote several literary works and soon developed a reputation as a very capable communicator. She became active in promoting women's rights.

In 1866 a feminist group called the Société pour la Revendication du Droit des Femmes began to meet at the house of André Léo. Members included Paule Minck, Louise Michel, Eliska Vincent, Élie Reclus and his wife Noémie, Mme Jules Simon and Caroline de Barrau. Maria Deraismes was persuaded to participate.

Because of the broad range of opinions, the group decided to focus on the subject of improving girls' education. In 1870 Deraismes founded L'Association pour le droit des femmes with Léon Richer. She helped fund Richer's paper Le Droit des femmes.

Following the ouster of Napoleon III, Deraismes understood the new politics of the day meant a more moderate approach under the Third Republic in order for feminism to survive and not be marginalized by the new breed of male power brokers emerging at the time.  Deraismes's work brought her recognition in Great Britain and she became an influence upon American activist Elizabeth Cady Stanton, who met her in Paris in 1882.

Maria Deraismes was initiated into Freemasonry on 14 January 1882, when it was still rare for a woman to be admitted into that Fraternity. She joined "Les Libres Penseurs" Lodge, of Pecq, a small village to the west of Paris. A year later, she and Georges Martin organized a Masonic lodge that allowed both men and women as members.  From this co-masonic Lodge developed the Grande Loge Symbolique Ecossaise "Le Droit Humain", which grew into the International Order of Freemasonry Le Droit Humain.

With support of other suffragettes such as Hubertine Auclert, Deraismes worked to achieve political emancipation for women. She stood as a symbolic candidate in the elections of 1885.

On her death in 1894, Deraismes was interred in the Montmartre Cemetery. Her complete writings were published in 1895. Much information on her work can be found at the Bibliothèque Marguerite Durand in Paris.

To honor her memory, a street in Paris was named for her. In addition, a statue was erected in a small park, Square de Epinettes in the 17th arrondissement. The town square in St. Nazaire was also named in her honor.

Publications

Original editions 
 Nos principes et nos mœurs, Paris, Michel Lévy frères, 1868.
 L’Ancien devant le nouveau, Paris, Librairie nationale, 1869.
 Lettre au clergé français, Paris, Édouard Dentu, 1879.
 Les Droits de l’enfant, Paris, Édouard Dentu, 1887.
 Épidémie naturaliste [Émile Zola et la science, discours prononcé au profit d’une société pour l’enseignement en 1880] par Maria Deraismes, Paris, Édouard Dentu, 1888, .
 Ève dans l’humanité, Paris, L. Sauvaitre, 1891, .
 Le Théâtre de M. Sardou, conference held on 21 January 1875, at the salle des Capucines, Paris, Édouard Dentu, 1875, .
 Ligue populaire contre l'abus de la vivisection : Discours prononcé par Mlle. Maria Deraismes, à la conférence donnée le 23 septembre 1883, au Théâtre des Nations, Paris, A. Ghio, 1884, .

 Œuvres complètes de Maria Deraismes
 Volume 1 : France et progrès ; Conférence sur la noblesse, Paris, Félix Alcan, October 1895, .
 Volume 2 : Eve dans l'Humanité ; Le Droits de l'Enfant, Paris, Félix Alcan, January 1896, .
 Volume 3 : Nos Principes et nos Mœurs ; L'ancien devant le Nouveau, Paris, Félix Alcan, January 1897, .
 Volume 4 : Lettre au clergé français ; Polémique religieuse, 1898.

Modern editions 
 Éve dans l'humanité, articles et conférences de Maria Deraismes, Préface d'Yvette Roudy, éd. Abeille et Castor, Angoulême, 2008. 
 Les Droits de L'enfant : conférence de Maria Deraismes, Lyon, Éd. Mario Mella, 1999.  
 Ce que veulent les femmes, articles et discours de 1869 à 1894, éd. Syros, 1980.

References

Sources

External links

The International Order of Freemasonry for Men and Women, LE DROIT HUMAIN

1828 births
1894 deaths
Writers from Paris
French political writers
French feminist writers
French suffragists
Burials at Montmartre Cemetery
French Freemasons
19th-century French women writers
Deraismes family